Alfred Ball (1890 – 3 October 1952) was an English professional footballer who made 97 appearances in the Football League for Lincoln City. He played as an outside left. He also played for Midland League club Mansfield Town and for Ilkeston United of the Central Alliance.

Life and career
Ball was born in Clowne, Derbyshire. He made his debut for Football League Second Division club Lincoln City in November 1913, and the following season – the last before the Football League was suspended for the duration of the First World War – he missed only one game. He was ever-present in the first postwar season as Lincoln finished 21st in the Second Division and failed to gain re-election, and missed only one match as they won the Midland League title and returned to the Football League as founder members of the Third Division North. Ball did not return with them: he remained in the Midland League, with Mansfield Town, and by late 1922 was playing for Central Alliance club Ilkeston United.

Ball died in 1952 aged about 62.

Notes

References

1890 births
1952 deaths
People from Clowne
Footballers from Derbyshire
English footballers
Association football wing halves
Lincoln City F.C. players
Mansfield Town F.C. players
Ilkeston United F.C. players
English Football League players
Midland Football League players
Date of birth unknown
Place of death missing